Miss Dial is an American romantic comedy film released February 16, 2013. The plot centers on a customer service representative who is a remote worker. One day, she decides to abandon her job duties, and instead spends her time calling random people, looking for new connections.

Cast 
 Robinne Lee as Erica
 Sam Jaeger as Kyle
 Jon Huertas as Alex
 Sara Rue as Sam
 Amanda Crew as Amanda
 Beth Grant as Mrs. Wojiechowski
 Gabrielle Union as Long Story Caller
 Samm Levine as Prank Caller
 Dendrie Taylor as TV Caller
 Dulé Hill as Popcorn Caller
 Hill Harper as Political Nutcase

References

External links
 
 

2013 films
2013 romantic comedy films